Faxonella is a genus of crayfish from the Southern United States from Texas to Florida. It comprises the following species:
Faxonella beyeri (Penn, 1950) "Sabine Fencing crayfish"
Faxonella blairi (Hayes and Reimer, 1977) "Blair's Fencing crayfish"
Faxonella clypeata (Hay, 1899) "Ditch Fencing crayfish or Shield crayfish"
Faxonella creaseri (Walls, 1968) "Ouachita Fencing crayfish"

References

Cambaridae
Freshwater crustaceans of North America
Decapod genera